Graeme Miller (24 September 1940 – 30 May 2008) was an Australian cricketer. He played one first-class match for Tasmania in 1970/71.

See also
 List of Tasmanian representative cricketers

References

External links
 

1940 births
2008 deaths
Australian cricketers
Tasmania cricketers
Cricketers from Launceston, Tasmania